The Kukhtuy is a river in Khabarovsk Krai, Russian Far East.

The basin of the Kukhtuy is a spawning ground for the coho salmon. Other fish species are also abundant in its waters, such as the Amur whitefish, East Siberian grayling, whitespotted char and round whitefish. The river is navigable in its lower reaches.

Course 
It flows relatively straight southwards through a mountainous area. The Yudoma Range rises on the right side and the Kukhtuy Range on the left side of its valley and its course is roughly parallel to rivers Okhota to the west and Ulbeya to the east.

South of the 61st parallel the river valley widens and the Kukhtuy meanders across a widening floodplain with many bogs and small lakes. Finally it flows into the Sea of Okhotsk on the northeastern side of the estuary of Okhotsk town. 

The river freezes around late October and stays frozen until mid May/.

See also
List of rivers of Russia

References

External links
Okhotsk Port - SHIPNEXT

Rivers of Khabarovsk Krai
Drainage basins of the Sea of Okhotsk